Exner is a surname. Notable people with the surname include:

Adam Exner (born 1928), Archbishop of the Roman Catholic Archdiocese of Vancouver from 1991 to 2004
Bethany Exner, fictional character
Felix Maria von Exner-Ewarten (1876–1930), Austrian meteorologist and geophysicist
Franz S. Exner (1849–1926), Austrian physicist
Győző Exner (1864–1945), Hungarian chess master
John E. Exner (1928–2006), born in Syracuse, New York, an American psychologist
Judith Exner (1934–1999), American woman, reputed to be mistress of US president John F. Kennedy and of two Mafia leaders
Julius Exner, (1825–1910), Danish genre painter
Sigmund Exner (1846–1926), Austrian physiologist who was a native of Vienna
Stanislav Kasparovich Exner (1859–1921), Polish-Russian musician and first director of Saratov State Conservatory
Virgil Exner (1909–1973), automobile designer for numerous American companies, notably Chrysler and Studebaker

See also
Call-Exner bodies, granulosa cells arranged haphazardly around a space containing eosinophilic fluid
Exner equation, statement of conservation of mass that applies to sediment in a fluvial system such as a river
Exner function, important parameter in atmospheric modeling
Exner Revival Cars, series of "Revival Car" concepts for a December, 1963 issue of Esquire magazine
Exner syndrome, disorder also known as serpentine fibula polycystic kidney syndrome